Flanary Archeological Site is a historic archaeological site located near Dungannon in Scott County, Virginia, United States.  Located across the Clinch River from Dungannon, the site was inhabited as early as 6000 BC and remained in periodic use into the Woodland period, with occupation potentially continuing until c. AD 1600.  The terminus ad quem for occupation is 1750, when Thomas Walker's expedition passed through the area and found no Indian villages.  Excavations conducted in 1977 in preparation for the construction of a bridge revealed that the village site, featuring posthole patterns indicating a palisade surrounding the village, lay primarily south of the bridge in the vicinity of a 1764 log cabin.

It was listed on the National Register of Historic Places in 1983.

References

Archaeological sites on the National Register of Historic Places in Virginia
National Register of Historic Places in Scott County, Virginia